Austrian army may refer to:

 Austrian Federal Army, the modern Austrian military
 Austro-Hungarian Army, the ground force of the Austro-Hungarian Dual Monarchy from 1867 to 1918
 Common Army, the largest part of the Austro-Hungarian Army from 1867 to 1914
 Imperial-Royal Landwehr (of Austria), 1867 to 1918
 Imperial and Royal Army during the Napoleonic Wars, the reformed armed force of the Austrian Empire (1792–1815)
 Imperial Austrian Army (1806–1867), army of the Austrian Empire

See also:
 Imperial Army (Holy Roman Empire), for short, was a name used for several centuries, especially to describe soldiers recruited for the Holy Roman Emperor during the Early Modern Period
 Army of the Holy Roman Empire, created in 1422, and came to an end even before the Holy Roman Empire was wound up in 1806, as the result of the Napoleonic Wars